The Common Component Architecture (CCA) was a standard for Component-based software engineering used in high-performance also known as scientific) computing. Features of the Common Component Architecture that distinguish it from commercial component standards Component Object Model, CORBA, Enterprise JavaBeans include support for Fortran programmers, multi-dimensional data arrays, exotic hardware and operating systems, and a variety of network data transports not typically suited for wide area networks.

Common Component Architecture activity appears to have ceased, with no news on the webpage since 2006.

External links 
 Common Component Architecture Forum

Software architecture
Component-based software engineering